May Thet Khine (born 24 September 1989) is a Burmese actress, model and singer who was one of the most popular actresses around 2000s. Throughout her career, she has acted in over 200 films.

Early life and education
May Thet Khine was born on 24 September 1989 in Yangon, Myanmar to parents Tint Lwin and his wife Moe Moe Yee. She is the only daughter and niece of actress May Thinzar Oo. She attended high school at Basic Education High School No. 2 Latha. She enrolled at Yangon University of Economics, and then she dropout of university at the first year.

Career

2005–2006: Beginnings
May Thet Khine started acting when she was four years old thanks to her aunt May Thinzar Oo, whose acting her reportedly hopes to emulate. She has no formal training in acting; however she says her aunt and director Wyne, have taught her a lot. In 2005, she appeared on local magazine cover photos, and as commercial model for many advertisements. Her hard work as a model and acting in commercials was noticed by the film industry and soon, film casting offers came rolling in.

2007–2012: Acting debut, recognition and retirement  
She officially entered the film industry in 2007 and acted in music videos. She earned the notice of the audience when she starred in the music video for the song "Moe" by singer Ye Lay. Then came the offers for TV commercials and then DVD ones. Her hardwork as a model and acting in commercials was noticed by the film industry and soon, film casting offers came rolling in. She made her acting debut with a leading role in the film Kyan Taw Ama Ma Kyar Nyo (My Sister Ma Kyar Nyo), alongside Htun Htun, Wyne Su Khaing Thein and Nawarat in 2007. She then starred in the film Ho Lu Gyi, where she played the leading role for a first time with actor Dwe. The film was a domestic hit, and led to increased recognition for May Thet Khine.

In 2008, she took on her first big-screen role in the film Dhamma Thawka Innwa Yarzar, alongside Lu Min which screened in Myanmar cinema in 2009. She then starred in her second big-screen film Amone Mee Tauk (The Flames of Hatred), where she played the leading role with Hein Wai Yan, Swan and Khant Si Thu, which screened in Myanmar cinema in 2012. The film was nominee in the shortlist of seven films for Myanmar Academy Awards 2012. She completely disappeared from the screens for four years when she was busy with her business.

2017–present: Return to screen
In 2017, May returned to the film industry and then starred in the military war film Pyidaungsu Thitsar, where she played the main role with Wai Lu Kyaw, Kyaw Ye Aung, Nay Dway, Soe Myat Thuzar, May Barani Thaw. The film was base on true story of the Battle of Mongkoe, directed by Tin Aung Soe (Pan Myo Taw). The film was shown on Myawaddy TV on 27 May 2017 at the 72nd Myanmar Tatmadaw Day and also screened in Myanmar cinemas on 27 March 2018.

Selected filmography

Film (Cinema)

Dhamma Thawka Innwa Yarzar (2009)
The Flame Of Hatred (2009)
Union Loyalty (2017)

Film

Over 200 films, including

References

External links

1989 births
Living people
Burmese film actresses
Burmese female models
21st-century Burmese actresses
People from Yangon